"All I Need" is a song recorded by English musician, singer, and songwriter Jake Bugg. It was released as a digital download and for streaming on 23 October 2020.

Background
The song was written by Jake Bugg and Steve Mac, who also produced the song. Talking about the song, Bugg said, "'All I Need' is about a moment of satisfaction or clarity. A feeling that comes when you are completely engaged in what you are doing, however you arrived there."

Live performances
On 15 January 2021, Bugg performed the song live on The Graham Norton Show.

Music video
A music video to accompany the release of "All I Need" was first released onto YouTube on 29 November 2020.

Track listing

Personnel
Credits adapted from Tidal.
 Steve Mac – Producer, composer, lyricist, keyboards
 Jake Bugg – Composer, lyricist, associated performer, guitar, vocal
 Joy Farrukis – Background Vocal
 Layla Ley – Background Vocal
 Subrina McCalla – Background Vocal
 Steve Pearce – Bass Guitar
 Chris Laws – Drums, engineer
 Bill Zimmerman – Engineer
 Dann Pursey – Engineer, percussion
 John Parricelli – Guitar
 Randy Merrill – Mastering Engineer
 Phil Tan – Mixing Engineer

Charts

Release history

References

2020 songs
2020 singles
Jake Bugg songs
Sony Music singles
Songs written by Jake Bugg
Songs written by Steve Mac